Thomas Peter Legh (1754–1797),  was a British Member of Parliament.

Born about 1754 he was the first son of Reverend Ashburnham Legh of Golborne and Charlotte Elizabeth Legh née Egerton.

He was educated at Brasenose College, Oxford.

In 1794 he spent over £20,000 raising a regiment of fencible cavalry, The Lancashire Fencible Cavalry, to which he was appointed Colonel.

Legh was Member of Parliament (MP) for the rotten borough of Newton in Lancashire from 1780 until his death in 1797.

He died on 7 August 1797 leaving seven illegitimate children and his estates to his eldest son, Thomas Legh.

Notes

References 

1797 deaths
British MPs 1780–1784
British MPs 1784–1790
British MPs 1790–1796
British MPs 1796–1800
1754 births